Karel Fortýn (1930–2001) was a Czech (originally Czechoslovakian) physician who invented a breakthrough surgical method in healing cancer called devitalization.

He had a son, Karel Fortyn, who dedicated his life to educating humans about reptiles, and founded the Seaway Serpentarium in Ontario, Canada. This exhibit housed Blade & Suede, two adult Orinoco crocodiles, whose offspring are (as of 2022) being released in Venezuela.

Karel often spoke of his father’s medical genius, and how it was covered up by communist government. 
Luckily, unfortunately 5 years after the son’s passing, the truth came out about the cancer treatments. 

Czech biologists
1930 births
2001 deaths
20th-century biologists